Bernhard Eduardovich Petri (17 September 1884 – 25 November 1937) was a Russian anthropologist and archaeologist. Petri organized archeology and ethnographic expeditions to Lake Baikal, while employed by the Kunstkamera during the 1910s.

Iron artifacts were discovered and used to propose the Kurumchi culture as the first Iron Age society of Baikalia. Petri became a professor at the Irkutsk State University and taught about the ancient history of the, Indigenous peoples of Siberia. He documented the cultures of several reindeer herding societies across the East Siberian taiga for Institute of the Peoples of the North throughout the 1920s and 1930s.

In 1937 Petri was executed by the NKVD during the Great Purge.

Early life
The Swedish Lutheran figure Olaus Petri was a paternal ancestor whose descendants later relocated to Livonia in contemporary Cēsis, Latvia. Imperial Russian authorities had sentenced Bernhard's father, Edward Petri, to internal exile for vague association with the revolutionary Land and Liberty. However, Edward escaped to Switzerland. Bernhard was born in 1884 in Bern while his father was an assistant professor of Geography and Anthropology at the city university. In 1887 Edward returned to St. Petersburg, received a pardon, and became a professor at the Saint Petersburg Imperial University.

Bernhard's childhood was spent in the Kingdom of Italy. At twelve he was enrolled at the Karl May School of Saint Petersburg in 1899. In the same year, Edward died and left his family in a perilous financial position. Evgenia joined the Kunstkamera to secure an income to support her two sons. She eventually became the head of the Australia and Oceania Department. Vasily Radlov was a colleague of Edward who after his death acted as the guardian of Bernhard.

Petri attended the St. Petersburg University where Radlov and Lev Sternberg became his primary academic influence. He developed a keen interest in anthropology, archeology, and ethnography as he felt the disciplines could combine to reconstruct the ancient material and spiritual cultures of contemporary societies. In 1910 he graduated from the university.

Academic career

Initial work
In 1910 Petri joined the Kunstkamera alongside his mother and Radlov as a junior ethnographer. His area of interest became the Buryats of Baikalia. In 1912 the Russian Committee for the Study of Central and East Asia directed Petri to head an expedition to Lake Baikal to document the Buryat material, religious, and social culture. He interviewed members of the Alar, Balagan, Kudin, and Verkholensk Buryat groups; developing an interest in the initiation rites for their shamans in the process.

During the first expedition Petri searched around the Murin River valley in modern Ekhirit-Bulagatsky district and the modern Olkhonsky district for ancient artifacts. The Neolithic site Ulan-Khada was discovered near contemporary Kurkut but wasn't excavated that year. In 1913 Petri returned to Baikalia and began formally excavating Ulan-Khada. Reportedly there were twelve distinct cultural layers at the site. Petri's findings there remain the basis for the chronology of ancient Baikalia. In 1916 Petri explored the cave systems of Olkhon Island.

Irkutsk State University
In the spring of 1918 Petri and his wife Lyubov relocated from Petrograd to Irkutsk. Oleg, their son, already resided there with his maternal grandparents. The city also served as the initial starting place of Petri's prior expeditions. Irkutsk attracted other academics from Kazan, Omsk, Perm, and Tomsk escaping the Siberian frontlines of the Russian Civil War. Despite the ongoing conflict the White government Minister of Education Vasily V. Sapozhnikov opened the Irkutsk State University in November 1918.

Initially, Petri served as a lecturer and soon became the professor in charge of the Department of Primitive History. He taught students about the ancient history of various Indigenous peoples of Siberia. In 1919 Petri established a university ethnographic paper dedicated to presenting independent student fieldwork. Many future academics presented their findings in the paper, including Georgy Debets, Mikhail M. Gerasimov, Pavel P. Khoroshikh, Gavriil Ksenofontov, Alexey Okladnikov, Vasily I. Podgorbunsky, and Georgy P. Sosnovsky

At the Irkutsk city museum, Petri became acquainted with the elderly Mikhail Pavlovich Ovchinnikov. They shared their archaeological findings and conclusions about the ancient history of Eastern Siberia. Petri reported that a frequent topic discussed was the origins of the Sakha people. These conversations were "jokingly dubbed" the "Yakut problem" as the two scholars speculated on the Sakha ethnogenesis. The Red Army captured Irkutsk in March 1920. Two years later the city museum was reopened with Petri serving as the head of the ethnology department.

In the 1920s Petri published his interpretation of the artifacts he found in Baikalia during the previous decade. He concluded that a hitherto unknown society produced the archaeological remains. Iron items were discovered in their settlements which led to Petri calling them the "Kurumchi blacksmiths". In autumn 1923 Petri led an expedition to Lake Khövsgöl. They used a steamboat to reconnoiter locations worth investigating. Locally produced watercraft made from Larix sibirica was then used to reach the sites to perform archaeological surveys. In dunes Petri discovered ceramic remains which he considered from the Kurumchi culture.

In 1926 the Department of History and Philology at Irkutsk State University was abolished. After the closure, Petri worked for a short time in 1928 at the Research Biological and Geographical Institute of the University.

Ethnography and activism
Established in 1924, the Institute of the Peoples of the North  funded several ethnographic expeditions overseen by Petri to certain Indigenous peoples of Siberia. The Sayan Mountains had several related cultures that traditionally practiced reindeer herding; the Dukha in the Mongolian People's Republic, the Tozhu Tuvans of the Tuvan People's Republic, and the Soyots and the Tofalar of the Soviet Union, located in the Buryat ASSR and the Irkutsk Oblast respectively. Two expeditions, occurring in 1925 and 1926, were focused on documenting these societies and was the longest Petri oversaw. The first was with the Tofalar. Petri noted that their hunting grounds were divided by patrilineal affiliation. The second expedition last six months and was among the Soyots. Petri encountered three groups that still practiced reindeer herding and counted 124 in total. Only one herd had reindeer as the principal animal, responsible for half those reported. The other two herds accounted for only a quarter of the total reindeer; combined they had 203 yaks and Mongolian cattle, along with 73 goats and sheep. 

In February 1929 Petri contacted the Irkutsk Committee of the North on behalf of the Soyot people. They couldn't afford to send a representative to the Buryat ASSR capital of Ulan-Ude. In the petition, Petri focused on several issues facing the Soyots. There was a heavy tax on milk produced by their cattle. A supposed loan of 5,000 Soviet rubles from the Buryat ASSR never materialized and no schools had been opened for them. The Soyots traditionally sourced their reindeer from the Todzhinsky District of Tuva. However, at the time, the Buryat authorities prevented Soyots from crossing the border. Petri recommended that a new Soyot administrative unit be established to remediate these issues. The Buryat ASSR government was able to prevent Petri from acting on behalf of the Soyots in the future by denouncing his petition:

Petri continued to study other Siberian Indigenous. During 1928 and 1929 he documented the material culture of the Upper Lena based Tuturo-Ocheul Evenks. While he argued against their relocation to the Lower Angara, Soviet authorities ignored his criticisms and underwent the forced movement.

In 1930 an expedition was organized to reach the Evenks that inhabited the Kalakan, Kalar, and Karenga tributaries of the Vitim River. The documentation was lost for decades but an article authored by Petri about the expedition was recovered and published in 2012. It was located in an archive containing the inventory of Northern Asia (a scholarly journal in the early USSR. Reportedly sedentary Evenks lived in log cabins. They bred chickens and domesticated geese but had small amounts of cows and horses. Vegetable gardens of carrots, potatoes, and turnips were maintained. The local fur trade started at the end of October and ended in February.

Petri led archaeological surveys of the Angara in 1934. Two years later he oversaw exploratory excavations on the Kuda

Great Purge
Petri became a victim of the Great Purge in 1937. In May he was charged with conspiring with a "German-Japanese fascist... right-wing Trotskyite organization in eastern Siberia" into provoking a revolt in the Buryat ASSR against the Soviet Union. On 1 November Petri was arrested. Under coercion, he named former academic mentor Vasily Radlov, who died in 1918, as his spy handler. According to Mikhail Konstantinov during the interrogations "Petri tried his best to ward off the threat from his colleagues and students." Petri was subsequently executed at 11:25 PM on 25 November 1937. His support for Siberian Indigenous likely contributed to his execution.

Legacy
Petri taught students that went on to pursue careers in anthropology, archaeology, economics, and geography. They collectively studied such topics as settlement patterns of various Siberian ethnicities, the reconstruction of ancient social systems, and the ethnogenesis of certain societies.

The Transbaikal Military District began a review of Petri's case in October 1958. It was found that he was innocent and improperly sentenced. On 19 June 1959 Petri was formally rehabilitated.

Bibliography

Published works

Books

Articles

Websites

References
 

1884 births
1937 deaths
People from Bern
Saint Petersburg State University alumni
Russian archaeologists
Russian ethnographers
Soviet ethnographers
Soviet archaeologists
Soviet historians
Irkutsk State University
20th-century archaeologists
Great Purge victims from Russia
Soviet rehabilitations